The Tramvia Blau (Catalan for "blue tramway") is one of Barcelona's three tram systems.

The Tramvia Blau is operated by Transports Metropolitans de Barcelona (TMB) but it is not part of Autoritat del Transport Metropolità (ATM) integrated fare network. Tickets must be purchased from the tram conductor.

The Tramvia Blau is one of only two first generation tramways to survive in Spain, along with the Tranvía de Sóller on the island of Majorca.

The Tibidabo tramway has been closed for reconstruction since Spring 2018.

History
The line was built at the instigation of Dr. Salvador Andreu, who was building a residential project around the axis of the Tibidabo Avenue, and was inaugurated in 1901. The line connected at Plaça Kennedy with trams of Barcelona's city system, but was independently owned. The line's own distinctive blue livery soon led to it becoming known as the Tramvia Blau.

The line suffered several changes in 1922 and 1958.

In 1954, line 7 of the Barcelona Metro was opened to Avinguda Tibidabo station under Plaça Kennedy, providing another connection to central Barcelona. However, in the 1960s the city trams were withdrawn from Plaça Kennedy, cutting the Tramvia Blau off from the city network.

In 1971 the remaining tram routes of the Tranvías de Barcelona company were closed. However, the separately owned Tramvia Blau remained in operation. It continued in private ownership until 1979, when it was taken over by the city, who continued to operate it. Between 1971 and 2004, when the second generation Trambaix and Trambesòs lines opened, it was the only tram route in the city.

Operation

Infrastructure

It is constructed to  gauge and is double track, apart from single track stub terminals at each terminus. It runs in the Avinguda Tibidabo throughout, and is not segregated from other traffic.

The depot branch joins the main line near its midpoint, adjacent to the bridge carrying the Avinguda Tibidabo over the Ronda de Dalt.

The line serves the following stops:

Tram fleet

The line is operated with a fleet of seven historic tram cars:

See also 
 Trambaix
 Trambesòs

References

External links

 Tramvia Blau page on the TMB web site
 Track plan of the current Barcelona tram system, including the Tramvia Blau
Tramvia Blau Travel Report (German)

Trams in Barcelona
Tram transport in Spain
Transport in Sarrià-Sant Gervasi
1901 establishments in Spain
Heritage streetcar systems